Yuquan is a town in Mianzhu, Sichuan province, China. , it administers the following five villages:
Yujiang Village
Longxing Village
Yongning Village
Guihua Village
Yongquan Village

References

Township-level divisions of Sichuan
Mianzhu